The men's 4 x 10 kilometre relay was held on 27 February 2009 at 13:00 CET. The defending world champions were the Norwegian team of Eldar Rønning, Odd-Bjørn Hjelmeset, Lars Berger and Petter Northug.

Results

References

External links
Final Results - International Ski Federation (FIS)

FIS Nordic World Ski Championships 2009